Dasyrhamphis is a species of 'horse fly' belonging to the family Tabanidae subfamily Tabaninae.

Species
Dasyrhamphis algirus (Macquart, 1838)
Dasyrhamphis anthracinus (Meigen & Wiedemann, 1820)
Dasyrhamphis ater (Rossi, 1790)
Dasyrhamphis carbonarius (Meigen, 1820)
Dasyrhamphis denticornis (Enderlein, 1925)
Dasyrhamphis franchinii Leclercq & Olsufiev, 1981
Dasyrhamphis goleanus (Szilády, 1923)
Dasyrhamphis insecutor (Austen, 1920)
Dasyrhamphis kuhedenaensis Ježek, 1981
Dasyrhamphis nigritus (Fabricius, 1794)
Dasyrhamphis tomentosus (Macquart, 1846)
Dasyrhamphis umbrinus (Wiedemann, 1820)
Dasyrhamphis villosus (Macquart, 1838)

Bibliography
Chvala M. Family Tabanidae // Catalogue of Palaearctic Diptera. Athericidae-Asilidae / Soós Á. Papp L. [eds]. — Amsterdam: Elsevier Science Publishers, 1988. — Vol. 5. — P. 122—135.
Leclercq M. Révision systématique et biogéographique des Tabanidae (Diptera) paléarctiques, 3. Sous-famille Tabaninae. Memoirs of the royal institute of natural sciences of Belgium second series. — 1966. — Vol. 80. — P. 5—120.
Mačukanović-Jocić M., Stešević D., Rančić D. and Stevanović Z. D. Pollen morphology and the flower visitors of Chaerophyllum coloratum L. (Apiaceae) (англ.) // Acta Botanica Croatica. — 2017. — Vol. 76, no. 76. — P. 1–8. — ISSN 0365-0588. — doi:10.1515/botcro-2016-0039.
 Shoeibi B. and Karimpour Y. Contributions to the knowledge of Asilidae (Diptera: Brachycera) from Azarbaijan provinces (Iran) Munis Entomology & Zoology Journal. — 2010. — No. Vol. 5, Suppl.. — P. 957—963.
 Altunsoy F., Kilic A. Y. Karyotype characterization of some Tabanidae (Diptera) species Turkiye Entomoloji Dergisi : 2010. — Vol. 34, no. 4. — P. 477—494. — ISSN 1010-6960.

References

Tabanidae
Insects described in 1922
Taxa named by Günther Enderlein
Diptera of Europe
Diptera of Africa
Brachycera genera